ATV Miss Asia Pageant 2011, was the 23rd Miss Asia Pageant, which began on 19 January 2012. The pageant slogan was "Beauties, Gathered in the Water." For the first time, the organizers created a separate event for all contestants of Chinese descent from mainland China, Hong Kong, Canada, the US, and Brazil into a semi-final, the results of whom competed with ten contestants of other Asian races. Michelle Feng of Beijing, China was the winner.

Background
The pageant was originally scheduled for fall 2011 but was delayed until early 2012 by the organizers. As in previous years, there was no upper age limit for the contestants. For the first time, the organizers created a separate event for all contestants of Chinese descent who represented different nations, ATV Miss Asia Pageant Greater China Finals 2011. It narrowed down the original 20 contestants to ten from China, Hong Kong, Canada, the US, and Brazil for another set of finals to compete with ten contestants of other Asian races.

Results

Special awards (Finals)
Miss Friendship: Vasinee Veeraphong (Thailand)
Miss Photogenic: Yi Joo Hong (Korea)
Gorgeous Award: Shuang Zhou (Hainan, China)
Perfect Figure Award: Michelle Feng (Beijing, China)
Fascinating Leggy Award: Shelly Inoue (Japan)

Special awards (Greater China Finals)
Greater China Miss Photogenic: Jolene Berube (Toronto, Canada)
Greater China Miss Cosmopolitan: Monica Lin (Taiwan)
Greater China Miss Goodwill: Samansa Hu (Brazil)

List of contestants

References

External links
 ATV Miss Asia Pageant 2011 official site

2011 beauty pageants
Beauty pageants in Hong Kong